Communauté d'agglomération Troyes Champagne Métropole is the communauté d'agglomération, an intercommunal structure, centred on the city of Troyes. It is located in the Aube department, in the Grand Est region, northeastern France. It was created in January 2017 by the merger of the former Communauté d'agglomération du Grand Troyes with 3 former communautés de communes and 6 other communes. Its area is 889.6 km2. Its population was 172,329 in 2018, of which 61,996 in Troyes proper.

Composition
The communauté d'agglomération consists of the following 81 communes:

Assenay
Aubeterre
Barberey-Saint-Sulpice
Les Bordes-Aumont
Bouilly
Bouranton
Bréviandes
Bucey-en-Othe
Buchères
La Chapelle-Saint-Luc
Clérey
Cormost
Courteranges
Creney-près-Troyes
Crésantignes
Dierrey-Saint-Pierre
Estissac
Fays-la-Chapelle
Feuges
Fontvannes
Fresnoy-le-Château
Isle-Aumont
Javernant
Jeugny
Laines-aux-Bois
Laubressel
Lavau
Lirey
Longeville-sur-Mogne
Lusigny-sur-Barse
Macey
Machy
Maupas
Mergey
Mesnil-Saint-Père
Messon
Montaulin
Montceaux-lès-Vaudes
Montgueux
Montiéramey
Montreuil-sur-Barse
Montsuzain
Moussey
Les Noës-près-Troyes
Le Pavillon-Sainte-Julie
Payns
Pont-Sainte-Marie
Prugny
La Rivière-de-Corps
Roncenay
Rosières-près-Troyes
Rouilly-Saint-Loup
Ruvigny
Saint-André-les-Vergers
Saint-Benoît-sur-Seine
Sainte-Maure
Sainte-Savine
Saint-Germain
Saint-Jean-de-Bonneval
Saint-Julien-les-Villas
Saint-Léger-près-Troyes
Saint-Lyé
Saint-Parres-aux-Tertres
Saint-Pouange
Saint-Thibault
Sommeval
Souligny
Thennelières
Torvilliers
Troyes
Vailly
Vauchassis
La Vendue-Mignot
Verrières
Villacerf
Villechétif
Villeloup
Villemereuil
Villery
Villy-le-Bois
Villy-le-Maréchal

References

Troyes Champagne Metropole
Troyes Champagne Metropole